Eram Amusement Park پارک ارم, is the largest theme park in Iran. The park was established in 1972 by Assadollah Khoram, after whom the park was named until 1979.

Eram Park consists of two lunaparks with 28 facilities with more than 120 devices for children and adults, Tehran Zoological Garden with more than 110 species, and an  lake for barefoot skiing, cable skiing, canoeing, rowing, and kayaking. It also has various fast food restaurants, cafés, and other restaurants.

References

Amusement parks in Iran
Buildings and structures in Tehran
Parks in Tehran
1972 establishments in Iran
Tourist attractions in Tehran